Olan Evart Soule (February 28, 1909 – February 1, 1994) was an American actor, who had professional credits in nearly 7,000 radio shows and commercials, appearances in 200 television series and television films, and in over 60 films.  Soule's voice work on television included his 15-year role (1968–1983) as Batman on several animated series that were either devoted to or involving the fictional "Dark Knight" superhero.

Early life
Born in 1909 in La Harpe, Illinois, to Elbert and Ann Williams Soule (descendants of three Mayflower passengers), Olan left Illinois at the age of seven and arrived in Des Moines, Iowa, where he lived until he was seventeen. He then launched his theatrical career by joining Jack Brooks' tent show in Sabula, Jackson County, Iowa.

Career

Radio
After leaving the tent show, Soule appeared on stage in Chicago for seven years before moving to radio in 1933, including a stint on Chandu the Magician (1935–36). On radio he performed for eleven years in the daytime soap opera Bachelor's Children. 

Beginning in 1943, he played lead male characters on radio's famed The First Nighter Program for nine years. Listeners of First Nighter who met Soule in person were often surprised, since his slight 135-pound frame did not seem to match the voices he gave to his characters. From 1941 on, Soule had the role of L. William Kelly, SS-11, the second in command of the Secret Squadron on the Captain Midnight radio adventure serial. 

When Captain Midnight became a television series in the 1950s, Soule was known as SQ-3, behind Captain Midnight himself and Ichabod Mudd "with two D's". He also had a regular part on Lee Hansen's 1970s and 1980s science fiction radio drama Alien Worlds.

Television and films
Concluding his nine-year run on First Nighter, Soule moved to Hollywood, where he appeared in films and television shows, building a reputation as a reliable character actor. Soule said "Because of my build and glasses, I've mostly played lab technicians, newscasters and railroad clerks."

He appeared as Mr. Krull, a boarding house resident in The Day The Earth Stood Still. He also acted in many television series: The Donald O'Connor Show (as a semi-regular), Captain Midnight (as scientist Aristotle "Tut" Jones), I Love Lucy, several appearances as a hotel clerk and choir director John Masters on The Andy Griffith Show, and a semi-regular role as real-life LAPD criminalist Ray Pinker on the original TV and radio version of Dragnet, and as the slightly renamed but essentially identical LAPD criminalist Ray Murray on the 1967 revival version. He played many different television roles in Jack Webb's Mark VII Productions including Dragnet, Adam-12, Emergency! and Project U.F.O..  

In between the two Dragnet gigs, he had a similar semi-regular role on another LAPD-based TV series, The New Breed, as an unnamed "lab technician."  He also made six appearances on Perry Mason, mostly as a court clerk, but also as a bank employee and water company official. He made at least two appearances on Petticoat Junction. In both, the 1967 episode "Shoplifter at the Shady Rest" and the 1968 episode "Mae's Helping Hand", he played Mr. Benson. In addition, he appeared several times as the clerk of the Carlton Hotel, the San Francisco residence of the character Paladin, in the TV series, Have Gun - Will Travel.

The list of Soule's supporting and starring roles is long.  Some include The George Burns and Gracie Allen Show, The Jack Benny Program, I Love Lucy,  The Danny Thomas Show, Dennis the Menace,  The Tab Hunter Show, The Real McCoys, The Beverly Hillbillies, Mister Ed, City Detective, Behind Closed Doors, Dante, Harrigan and Son, Hennesey, State Trooper, One Step Beyond, The Restless Gun, The Rebel, Wanted: Dead or Alive, My Favorite Martian, The Twilight Zone, The Untouchables, Bewitched, Pete and Gladys, The Addams Family, The Munsters, Johnny Ringo, Rawhide, Gunsmoke, Happy, Bonanza, The Jean Arthur Show, Laramie, The Monkees, Mission: Impossible, The Six Million Dollar Man, Buck Rogers in the 25th Century, Fantasy Island, Little House on the Prairie, Dallas and Simon & Simon. He was the only actor who performed on both the Captain Midnight radio and television shows.

Batman
Soule is remembered by many for providing the voice of Batman in several animated series. He first performed as the Caped Crusader on the 1968 Filmation-produced The Batman/Superman Hour. He reprised his role as Batman on The New Scooby-Doo Movies, Sesame Street (1970), Super Friends (1973), The All-New Super Friends Hour, Challenge of the Super Friends, The World's Greatest Super Friends, and Super Friends (1980). He appeared as a newscaster on the live-action Batman television series (in the episode "The Pharaoh's in a Rut") with his Super Friends successor Adam West. Although Soule eventually gave back the Batman mantle to the man who portrayed him in live-action, he continued to contribute to the Super Friends: The Legendary Super Powers Show series, providing the voice of Professor Martin Stein, mentor and subconscious of fledgling hero Firestorm.

Other voice-over work
Soule provided the voice of Master Taj in the English-dubbed version of the cult 1973 film Fantastic Planet in addition to his work as Batman.

Personal life and death 
Soule married Norma Elizabeth Miller on September 29, 1929. They had two children and were married for 63 years, until Norma's death on July 1, 1992. His daughter Joann was also an actress, under the name of Sydney Soule.  Soule was a 32-degree Mason as well as a member of the Los Angeles Show Business Shrine Club (Al Malikah).

On February 1, 1994, Soule died four weeks before his 85th birthday of lung cancer in Corona, California, at the home of his daughter Joann and son-in-law, Dr. David Henriksen.  His burial took place at Forest Lawn Memorial Park in Hollywood Hills, Los Angeles.

Selected filmography

 It's a Great Feeling (1949) - Flack (uncredited)
 Destination Big House (1950) - Ralph Newell 
 Cuban Fireball (1951) - Jimmy
 The Atomic City (1952) - Mortie Fenton
 Francis Joins the WACS (1954) - Capt. Creavy, Psychiatrist
 Dragnet (1954) - Ray Pinker 
 Cult of the Cobra (1955) - Major Martin Fielding
 -30- (1959) - Vince, the sports editor 
 The Bubble (1966) - Watch Repairman
 The Destructors (1968) - Mace 
 The Seven Minutes (1971) - Harvey Underwood
 Fantastic Planet (1973) - Master Taj (English version, voice)
 The Towering Inferno (1974) - Johnson
 The Apple Dumpling Gang (1975) - Rube Cluck
 St. Ives (1976) - Station Man
 The Shaggy D.A. (1976) - Bar Patron 
 Homicide (1991) - Crime Scene Technician (final film role)

Selected television roles

References

External links
 1989 interview with Olan Soule on the radio show Those Were the Days
 
 

1909 births
1994 deaths
People from Hancock County, Illinois
Male actors from Des Moines, Iowa
American male film actors
American male radio actors
American male stage actors
American male television actors
American male voice actors
Burials at Forest Lawn Memorial Park (Hollywood Hills)
Deaths from lung cancer in California
20th-century American male actors
Western (genre) television actors